All in the Mind may refer to:

All in the Mind (BBC radio), radio series on BBC about psychology and psychiatry
"All in the Mind" (song), a 1992 song by the rock band The Verve
All in the Mind (Australian Broadcasting Corporation radio), Australian radio programme
"(Probably) All in the Mind", a song by British rock band Oasis from their album Heathen Chemistry
 All in the Mind (album), an album by The Bucketheads
 All in the Mind (novel), a 2008 novel by Alastair Campbell